Kriti may refer to:

Art and entertainment 
 Kriti (music), a format of musical composition typical to Carnatic music
 Kriti (film), a 2016 Hindi-language short film
 Kriti TV, Greek TV station

People with the name
 Kriti Bharti, Indian psychologist and activist
 Kriti Kharbanda (born 1990), Indian film actress
 Kriti Malhotra, Bollywood actress and costume designer
 Kriti Sanon (born 1990), Indian actress
 Kriti Sharma (born 1988), Artificial intelligence technologist, business executive and humanitarian

Ships 
 MS Kriti I
 Kriti-class destroyer

Other uses 
 Crete, or Kriti, a Greek island

See also 
 Kirti
 Kruti Dev